The 2006 Special Honours in New Zealand was a Special Honours List, published in New Zealand on 3 August 2006 and effective from the previous day. Appointments were made to the Queen's Service Order to recognise the outgoing governor-general, Dame Silvia Cartwright, and vice-regal consort, Peter Cartwright.

Additional Companion of the Queen's Service Order (QSO)
For community service
 Peter John Cartwright 

For public services
 The Honourable Dame Silvia Rose Cartwright

References

Special honours
Special honours